A grace-and-favour home is a residential property owned by a monarch by virtue of his or her position as head of state and leased, often rent-free, to persons as part of an employment package or in gratitude for past services rendered.  

In the United Kingdom, these homes are owned by the Crown or a charity and, in modern times, are often within the gift of the prime minister. Most of these properties are taxed as a "benefit in kind", although this status does not apply to 10 Downing Street or any home granted for security purposes, such as the residence of the Secretary of State for Northern Ireland. They are at times granted to senior politicians.
  
It is possible that the term crept into English through the writings of Niccolò Machiavelli, who wrote of advisers who are ministers per grazia e concessione, which has been translated as "through grace and favour".

England
In 1986, there were 120 apartments total, the most splendid being at Kensington Palace where the Prince of Wales, Duke and Duchess of Gloucester, and Prince and Princess Michael of Kent lived. There are also some at Windsor Castle, and Buckingham Palace. St James's Palace had 20 apartments. Lord Kitchener once lived there, as did the Duke of Windsor. Most apartments are modest, some two rooms, inhabited mostly by retired members of the household staff. Hampton Court apartments were generally occupied by retired soldiers and diplomats or (more usually) by their widows. Grace and favour apartments have been discontinued at Hampton Court. There were once 69. In 1986, this had dwindled to 15. 

In the latter part of Queen Victoria's reign, Frogmore Cottage in the Home Park, Windsor, was the grace and favour residence of her Indian attendant, Abdul Karim (the Munshi). In 2018, it was renovated for the Duke and Duchess of Sussex, who moved into it in the spring of 2019.

Other residences include:
 10 Downing Street, City of Westminster — official residence of the First Lord of the Treasury (now always the Prime Minister of the United Kingdom)
 Chequers, Ellesborough — official country house of the Prime Minister
 11 Downing Street, Westminster — official residence of the Chancellor of the Exchequer (Second Lord of the Treasury)
 12 Downing Street, Westminster — official residence of the Chief Whip
 Dorneywood, Burnham — official ministerial residence; a country residence usually for use of the Chancellor, or for the Deputy Prime Minister. (Used by Chancellor during May ministry)
 Admiralty House, Westminster — official ministerial residence
 1 Carlton Gardens, Westminster — official ministerial residence; usually for the Foreign Secretary
 Chevening House, Chevening, Kent — official ministerial residence; usually a country residence for use of the Foreign Secretary (During the May ministry, the house was set to be used by the Foreign Secretary, Brexit Secretary, and International Trade Secretary)
 Speaker's House, Palace of Westminster, Westminster — official residence of the Commons' Speaker
 Lord Speaker's Apartments, Palace of Westminster, Westminster — official residence of the Lord Speaker.
 Nottingham Cottage at Kensington Palace - previously occupied by the Duke and Duchess of Sussex until their move to Frogmore Cottage; previously occupied by other members of the Royal Family or by senior courtiers.
 Garden House, Mayfair — official residence of the Commonwealth Secretary-General
 Adelaide Cottage a royal family property located just 10 minutes' walk from the King's residence in Windsor.

Northern Ireland
 Hillsborough Castle, Hillsborough — official ministerial residence for the Northern Ireland Secretary

Scotland
 Bute House, Charlotte Square, Edinburgh — official residence of the First Minister of Scotland.
 Tulliallan Castle, Kincardine, Fife — official residence of the Chief Constable of Police Scotland.
 Moderator's Flat, Rothesay Terrace — official residence of the Moderator of the General Assembly of the Church of Scotland

In popular culture

Mary Treadgold's novel for children, The Winter Princess (1962) concerns a child who comes to stay in a grace and favour apartment at Hampton Court.

Gallery

See also
Royal Parks of London

References

British monarchy
Housing in the United Kingdom
Official residences in the United Kingdom